The Governing Mayor of Oslo (Norwegian: Byrådsleder) is the head of the city government of Oslo. The Governing Mayor appoints and removes the members (vice mayors) of the city cabinet and decides how the departments and the central administration are organised. The city government consists of eight members.

Current 

The current Governing Mayor of Oslo is Raymond Johansen. He took office on 21 October 2015.

List of governing mayors

Key

References 

Government of Oslo